The Roman Catholic Diocese of Mogadishu is a diocese of the Roman Catholic Church located in the city of Mogadishu, Somalia. The area of the diocese coincides with that of the country. It is the only diocese in Somalia. The see has been vacant since the assassination of the last bishop, Salvatore Colombo, in 1989. The diocese is a member of the Conference of the Latin Bishops of the Arab Regions.

History
In the pre-independence period, British Somaliland was under the care of the Apostolic Vicariate of Arabia, like the Apostolic Vicariate of the Galla (including French Somaliland as well as its Ethiopian main territory) confided to the Order of Friars Cappuccini. Italian Somaliland was from 1904 the "Prefecture Apostolic of Benadir", and entrusted to the ancient Trinitarian Order. In 1927, it was promoted to Apostolic Vicariate.

 1904: Established as Apostolic Prefecture of Benadir
 1927: Promoted as Apostolic Vicariate of Mogadishu 
 1975: Promoted as Diocese of Mogadishu

Bishops

Prefects Apostolic of Benadir 
 Alessandro dei Santi, OSST (1905–1924)
 Bishop , IMC (Apostolic administrator 1924 – 22 December 1927)

Vicars Apostolic of Mogadishu 
 , IMC (22 December 1927 – August 1930)
 , OFM (14 July 1931 – 24 May 1932)
 , OFM (23 May 1933 – 19 October 1970)
 , OFM (19 October 1970 – 1 January 1973)

Bishops of Mogadishu 
 Salvatore Colombo, OFM (20 November 1975 – 9 July 1989)
 Bishop Giorgio Bertin, OFM (Apostolic administrator 29 April 1990 – present)

See also
Catholic Church in Somalia
Christianity in Somalia
Mogadishu Cathedral

Sources
 Catholic Hierarchy
 GCatholic.org

Roman Catholic dioceses in Somalia
Christian organizations established in 1904
Roman Catholic dioceses and prelatures established in the 20th century